The Flanagan Hotel in Malone, New York was built in 1917, and is the second hotel of this name to be located on the corner of East Main street and Elm Street in the Village of Malone. The Flanagan  family owned a much smaller hotel at this location which was founded in 1857. The older hotel was a meeting place during the historical Fenian Raids. The current building is still the largest building in the historic downtown of Malone. In the Flanagan's heyday it was said by locals and travelers alike that it was the largest hotel north of Albany, New York. The hotel suffered a fire in 1997 supposedly started by someone falling asleep while smoking on their bed in their hotel room. The building from the fire, in 1997, to 2007 was undisturbed. The Flanagan is thought to be an eyesore by many while others see it as a link to Malone's prominent and historical past started the aggressive campaigns of William A. Wheeler to bring the New York Central and Rutland Railroads to town. It is currently partially renovated sitting at a standstill after Frank Cositore, the old owner got foreclosed on in 2009. After sitting for numerous years, he is trying to negotiate to buy back the 120+ year old hotel.

The hotel was planned to become a 5 star Best Western Hotel with multiple restaurants, a night club, and a pool on the Roof. This was not widely appreciated by the community because it was considered overambitious.

There have been many new plans. For example, there is one that scales down the budget by 4 million dollars and breaks the project up into 3 more economically feasible small projects. There has also been talk of turning the Flanagan in to college dorms for North Country Community College. Additionally NCCC has recently held community art exhibits in the partially renovated hotel.

Poem About the Flanagan 

"The Hotel Flanagan"
Everything about the place
Is new and spic and span.
The elevator runs upstairs
Once in a while or later!
But when it comes to meals
Jack and Sam know how to cater!"
— Author unknown, 1914.

Famous/Infamous Guests 

 Dutch Schultz
 Teddy Roosevelt
 Eleanor Roosevelt
 Henry Morgenthau, Sr.
 Thomas Edison
 Alexander Graham Bell
 Harvey Firestone
 Robert F. Kennedy
 Nelson Rockefeller

References

External links 
 
 
 
 
 
 
 

Buildings and structures in Franklin County, New York
Hotel buildings completed in 1917
Hotels in New York (state)